Alan Marshal may refer to:

Alan Marshal (cricketer) (1883–1915), Australian cricketer
Alan Marshal (actor) (1909–1961), Australian-born actor in Hollywood

See also
Alan Marshall (disambiguation)
Marshal (disambiguation)